Nothing but the Best is a 1964 British black comedy film directed by Clive Donner based on the 1952 short story 'The Best of Everything' by Stanley Ellin.

Plot
James, a young man starting with a large London firm of estate agents and auctioneers, is ambitious to get to the top. In a cheap café, he meets Charles, a drunken layabout who has everything James wants: effortless upper-class arrogance and impeccable tailoring. In return for a room to live in and loans for drink and betting, Charles agrees to tutor James in the life skills he thinks he needs to succeed. By bluff and sabotage, James rises in his firm, catching the eye of the owner and of his only daughter Ann.

Disaster threatens when Charles has a big win and wants to end the deal. James hastily strangles him and his landlady agrees to hide the corpse in her cellar in return for continuing their sexual liaison. After a long courtship, Ann agrees to marry James and her father makes him a partner in the business. Having conveniently sent his lower-middle-class parents to Australia, James anticipates his success being crowned by a grand society wedding. Ann's father confesses that he has a totally disreputable son they never see called Charles and developers who have bought the house of James' former landlady find a corpse in the cellar.

Selected cast

References

External links
 
 

1964 films
1960s black comedy films
1960s thriller films
British black comedy films
British satirical films
British thriller films
1960s English-language films
Films directed by Clive Donner
Films shot at Associated British Studios
British independent films
Films based on short fiction
Films scored by Ron Grainer
1964 comedy films
1964 drama films
Films set in London
1960s British films